Andrew Millison is a permaculture designer and instructor based out of the Pacific Northwest. He has been studying, designing, building, and teaching permaculture since 1996. In 2009 Millison began teaching at Oregon State University where he currently teaches the Permaculture Design Course and an Advanced Permaculture Design Practicum. He has also taught through several other organizations including the Ecosa Institute, Prescott College, the Cascadia Permaculture Institute, as well as being a guest instructor in Permaculture courses throughout the United States.
Millison first began studying Permaculture at Prescott College in Arizona. It was there that he started a Permaculture landscape design and build company focusing on rainwater harvesting, greywater systems, and desert agriculture. After relocating to Oregon, he focused on farm planning, permaculture housing projects, and water design. He founded Permaculture Rising and Permaculture Design International. In 2016, he hosted an international online completely free Introduction to Permaculture course through Oregon State University.

See also
Brad Lancaster
Nicholas Burtner

References

Living people
Oregon State University faculty
Permaculturalists
Year of birth missing (living people)
Place of birth missing (living people)